William J. Yearta (born June 22, 1958) is an American politician from Georgia. Yearta is a Republican member of Georgia House of Representatives for District 152.

References

External links 
 Bill Yearta at Ball
 Bill Yearta at votesmart.org

Republican Party members of the Georgia House of Representatives
21st-century American politicians
Living people
1958 births